Samudrasanna Vihara is a historic Buddhist temple situated at Mount-Lavinia in the Western province, Sri Lanka. It is located near to the Templers road junction on the Colombo-Galle main road. The temple has been formally recognised by the Government as an archaeological site in Sri Lanka. The designation was declared on 6 June 2008 under the government Gazette number 1553.

References

External links

 

Religious buildings and structures completed in 1845
Archaeological protected monuments in Colombo District
Buddhist temples in Colombo District